Mitochondrial rRNA methyltransferase 1 is a protein that in humans is encoded by the MRM1 gene.

References

Further reading